Andrea Jeftanovic (born October 15, 1970, in Santiago de Chile) is a Chilean author, sociologist and academic.

Jeftanovic was three when the September 11, 1973 Chilean military coup took place. She grew up under Augusto Pinochet's military regime. Jeftanovic has commented that the 17 years of military dictatorship that Chileans lived under had a profound effect on the development of a Chilean identity, by interrupting how Chileans perceive themselves or how the world perceives Chile.

She graduated from the Universidad Católica in social science and earned a doctorate in Hispanic-American literature from the University of California, Berkeley. She has held an academic post at the University Diego Portales.

Jeftanovic is the daughter of a Serbian father and a mother of Bulgarian-Jewish descent.

Works 
Escenario de guerra, novel, Alfaguara, Santiago, 2000 (Baladí, Madrid, 2010; Lanzallamas, Costa Rica, 2012; e-book, expanded and corrected: Patagonia, 2012)
Monólogos en fuga, short stories, Animita Cartonera, 2006
Geografía de la lengua, novel, Uqbar, Santiago, 2007
Amar numa língua estrangeira, Editorial Teorema –  Grupo Leya, Portugal, 2013
Conversaciones con Isidora Aguirre, interviews, Frontera Sur, Santiago, 2009
Hablan los hijos, essays, Cuarto Propio, 2011
No aceptes caramelos de extraños, short stories, Uqbar, Santiago, 2011 (Seix Barral México, 2012; Editorial Casa de las Américas 2015- Cuba; Editorial Comba – Spain 2015)
Destinos errantes, fiction chronicles, Editorial Comba, Barcelona, 2016 (Tajamar Editores, Santiago, 2017)

Awards (Chile) 
Juegos Literarios Gabriela Mistral
Consejo Nacional de la Cultura y las Artes
Círculo de Críticos de Arte de Chile “Mejor obra literaria 2011"

References

External links 
Article on Andrea Jeftanovic in El Nuevo Diario - Managua, Nicaragua July 11, 2007
Selected excerpts from her book Geografía de la lengua (Geography of Language)

1970 births
Chilean people of Serbian descent
Chilean people of Bulgarian-Jewish descent
Chilean Jews
Jewish novelists
Living people
Chilean women novelists
Writers from Santiago
21st-century Chilean women writers
21st-century Chilean novelists